Juan Antonio Martínez (born 21 December 1920) is a Cuban fencer. He competed in the individual sabre and team épée events at the 1948 Summer Olympics.

References

External links
 

1920 births
Possibly living people
Cuban male fencers
Olympic fencers of Cuba
Fencers at the 1948 Summer Olympics